Chetwynd is a civil parish in the district of Telford and Wrekin, Shropshire, England.  It contains 32 listed buildings that are recorded in the National Heritage List for England.  Of these, three are listed at Grade II*, the middle of the three grades, and the others are at Grade II, the lowest grade. The parish contains the Chetwynd Park estate, and the small settlements of Pickstock, Howle, and Sambrook, and is otherwise completely rural. Some of the listed buildings are associated with the Chetwynd Park estate, and most of the others are houses and associated structures, farmhouses and farm buildings.  Also listed are two churches, a medieval cross, water mills, bridges, a former windmill, and a war memorial.


Key

Buildings

References

Citations

Sources

Lists of buildings and structures in Shropshire